Doleschallia polibete, the Australian leafwing, is a butterfly in the family Nymphalidae described by Pieter Cramer in 1779.

Larva have been found on plants of the genera Asystasia, Grapthyllum, Pseuderanthemum and Strobilanthes.

Subspecies
Doleschallia polibete celebensis Fruhstorfer, 1899 (Menado, Toli-Toli; Tombugu)
Doleschallia polibete sulaensis Fruhstorfer, 1899 (Sula Islands) 
Doleschallia polibete maturitas Tsukada, 1985 (Banggai)

References

Butterflies described in 1779
Kallimini